Frontinella laeta is a sheet weaver species found in Mexico. It was first described by Octavius Pickard-Cambridge in 1898.

References

Linyphiidae
Spiders of Mexico
Spiders described in 1898